Louisa Colpeyn (24 February 1918 – 26 January 2015) was a Belgian actress. She appeared in more than thirty films from 1939 to 1983. Colpeyn is the mother of writer Patrick Modiano.

Filmography

References

External links 

1918 births
2015 deaths
Belgian film actresses